Jared Makaio Murillo  (born August 6, 1988) is an American professional dancer known for his works as a dancer in the Disney Channel movies, High School Musical, High School Musical 2 and for having a special cameo appearance in High School Musical 3: Senior Year.  He is also in a boyband called V Factory.

Early life
He was born in Honolulu, Hawaii. He is the fourth of seven children. At age 5, he began to sing in church. By the time he was 8, he performed with Donny Osmond, in Joseph and the Amazing Technicolor Dreamcoat production. He was the youngest cast member of the show. Three years later, at age 11, he was chosen to perform at the famous Suzuka Race Circuit in Nagoya, Japan.
He is a member of the Church of Jesus Christ of Latter-day Saints.  Jared began his training at Center Stage performing Arts in Orem, Utah. Jared's parents are the owners.  This is the same studio that has produced Julianne Hough, Derek Hough, Ashly DelGrosso-Costa, Chelsie Hightower, Jaymz Tuialeva, and Hefa Tuita.

Career
In 1994, he competed in ballroom dancing and became a national champion. He soon achieved success on the dance floor and started to win various events around the country. This caught the eye and the attention of world-class coach and choreographer, Buddy Schwimmer.   At age 14, he went to live for three years in Southern California. He achieved his goal of winning world  and national titles when he captured with his partner the World Swing, United States Swing and the United States Youth Latin Ballroom Championships and the AAU National DanceSport Championships.

In 2002 the Winter Olympics came to Salt Lake City where Murillo performed as part of the Opening Ceremonies. It was there he met Kenny Ortega who choreographed the show. Although they didn't realize at the time, just three years later they would meet up again as principal dancers in Disney Channel's High School Musical production. In January 2003, Murillo was paired with Lacey Schwimmer, and the two began competing at a junior level.

In 2006, he appeared in the High School Musical series and in 2007 he was a member of the background dancers of the High School Musical: The Concert for United States, Canada and Latin America. He also appears in the Ashley Tisdale music videos "Be Good to Me", "He Said She Said" and "Not Like That". He has also made an appearance on The Suite Life of Zack & Cody, appearing in the episode "Loosely Ballroom" as a competitor in the dance competition. However, he was not credited for the role. Also he played in one episode "Big Time Rush".

He took part in series 8 of the BBC Television series Strictly Come Dancing - his professional partner was Aliona Vilani and his celebrity partner was Tina O'Brien. They did not dance in the third week, as Tina had chickenpox. However, he did not return for season 9. Jared also took part in "Glee: The Tour" as a member of Vocal Adrenaline.

V Factory

Murillo in 2006 became a member of  American Pop/R&B/Urban boyband V Factory.  The band began in September 2006 when Tommy Page discovered Jared performing in the High School Musical concert. He then formed the group around Jared. Love Struck was released on January 27, 2009, on iTunes.

They signed a Warner Bros. Records deal later that year and are currently under the management of Tommy Page.

References

External links

1988 births
Living people
American male dancers
American ballroom dancers
Latter Day Saints from Hawaii
V Factory members
Latter Day Saints from Utah
Latter Day Saints from California